Buyi language can refer to:

Bouyei language
Buyu language